Mercado Central is the Spanish term for Central Market, and can refer to:

Mercado Central, Valencia, Spain
Mercado Central de Santiago, Chile
Mercado central de Pontevedra, Spain 
Mercado Central (TV series), a Spanish soap opera